In enzymology, a [protein-PII] uridylyltransferase is an enzyme that catalyzes the chemical reaction

UTP + [protein-PII]  diphosphate + uridylyl-[protein-PII]

Thus, the two substrates of this enzyme are UTP and protein-PII, whereas its two products are diphosphate and [[uridylyl-[protein-PII]]].

This enzyme belongs to the family of transferases, specifically those transferring phosphorus-containing nucleotide groups (nucleotidyltransferases).  The systematic name of this enzyme class is UTP:[protein-PII] uridylyltransferase. Other names in common use include PII uridylyl-transferase, and uridyl removing enzyme.  This enzyme participates in two-component system - general.

References

 
 

Protein-PII uridylyltransferase
Enzymes of unknown structure